Sabri Peqini (15 December 1926 – 13 March 2021) was an Albanian footballer and football manager, who played for and coached Dinamo Tirana.

International career
He made his debut for Albania in a June 1950 friendly match against Bulgaria and earned a total of 3 caps, scoring no goals. His final international was a December 1952 friendly against Czechoslovakia.

Personal life
Born to Hahxiu and Shahe, Sabri grew up in Shijak. He was the father of former Albanian international Kastriot Peqini and grandfather of Jurgen Peqini, also a professional footballer.

Peqini was interviewed in November 2019. He stated that he no longer attended football matches as he believed the sport to be too motivated by money. He died in March 2021 at the age of 94.

Honours
 as a player
Albanian Superliga: 4
 1950, 1951, 1952, 1953

Albanian Cup: 5
 1950, 1951, 1952, 1953, 1954

 as a manager
Albanian Superliga: 1
 1975

References

1926 births
2021 deaths
People from Belsh
Albanian footballers
Albania international footballers
KF Erzeni players
FK Dinamo Tirana players
Kategoria Superiore players
Albanian football managers
KF Elbasani managers
FK Dinamo Tirana managers
Association footballers not categorized by position